Sirigu is a Sardinian surname.

The surname is found mostly in Ogliastra and the communes of Nurri, Orroli up to Seneghe and is mentioned as Siricu in the San Pietro in Silki and San Michele di Salvennor's Conaghe. The surname could come from the Latin sericus.

People with the surname Sirigu:

 Salvatore Sirigu (born 1987), Italian professional footballer
 Sandro Sirigu (born 1988), Italian-German footballer

Sirigu may also refer to:

 Sirigu (Ghana) a village in the Upper East Region of Ghana

See also
Sardinian surnames

Surnames of Italian origin